Brand Park is a recreation facility in Mission Hills, Los Angeles, California. It is located directly south of the Mission San Fernando Rey de España. Its western section contains the historic Brand Park Memory Garden along with the Brand Park Community Center which is used as a multi-purpose area for events. In its eastern section there are grass fields, two baseball diamonds, and a parking lot.

History 

The park is named after Leslie Brand, a developer who owned property near the mission. He donated a portion of this land to the City of Los Angeles in 1920; this portion became Brand Park.The Brand Park Memory Garden was designated a California Historic Landmark (No. 150) on Jan. 11, 1935.

State marker
NO. 150 BRAND PARK (MEMORY GARDEN) - Brand Park, also called Memory Garden, was given to the city for a park November 4, 1920. It is a part of the original land grant of Mission San Fernando de Rey de España, and the colorful and picturesque atmosphere of the early California missions is preserved in Memory Garden.

References 

Parks in Los Angeles
Geography of Los Angeles County, California
Landforms of Los Angeles County, California
California Historical Landmarks
1920 establishments in California